National anthem of SA or SA national anthem may refer to:

"National Anthem of Saudi Arabia"
National anthem of South Africa